Güldalı is a village in the Yüksekova District of Hakkâri Province in Turkey. The village had a population of 377 in 2022.

History 
The village was populated by 14 Assyrian families in 1850, while no Assyrians were recorded in 1877.

Population 
Population history from 2000 to 2022:

References 

Villages in Yüksekova District
Kurdish settlements in Hakkâri Province
Historic Assyrian communities in Turkey